This Is Your Life is an Australian television documentary and reality show, based on the American show of the same name, which was created, produced and originally hosted by Ralph Edwards, in which the presenter surprises celebrity guests with a show documenting their lives, with audience participation from their friends and family.

Original broadcast 
The original series began broadcasting in Australia in 1975 on the Seven Network, with Bill Lovelock as executive producer and Mike Willesee as host. Subsequent seasons were compered by Digby Wolfe (1976) and Roger Climpson (1977–1980).

Nine Network versions
In 1995, the Nine Network relaunched the program with a 13-year successful run hosted by journalist Mike Munro. In November 2010, it was announced that the show would return on 28 February 2011 and be hosted by Eddie McGuire; however, it was not as successful, and after just four episodes the show did not return.

Seven Network revival
On 27 January 2022, a revival for the Seven Network was announced, to be hosted by Melissa Doyle. The first episode, which aired on 24 July 2022, featured Olympic swimmer Ian Thorpe.

References

External links
 This is Your Life at the National Film and Sound Archive

Seven Network original programming
Nine Network original programming
1970s Australian documentary television series
1980s Australian documentary television series
1990s Australian documentary television series
2000s Australian documentary television series
2010s Australian documentary television series
2020s Australian documentary television series
1975 Australian television series debuts
1980 Australian television series endings
1995 Australian television series debuts
2005 Australian television series endings
2008 Australian television series debuts
2008 Australian television series endings
2011 Australian television series debuts
2011 Australian television series endings
2022 Australian television series debuts
Australian television series based on American television series
Australian television series revived after cancellation
English-language television shows
Black-and-white Australian television shows